Feng Shan or feng-shan, also referred to as the Feng and Shan sacrifices, was an official rite offered by the Son of Heaven (kings of Zhou and later emperors of China) to pay homage to heaven and earth. The sacrifices were usually offered at Mount Tai, the highest peak in the area, and nearby Mount Liangfu. The emperor would pay homage to heaven (on the summit) and earth (at the foot of the mountain) in the Feng and Shan sacrifices respectively. Completing Feng Shan allowed the emperor to receive the mandate of heaven.  The term 'feng' can roughly be translated to mean "to seal", while the term 'shan' can roughly be translated to mean "to clear away".

It is considered among the most important rituals of religious Confucianism. 

According to the Records of the Grand Historian, Feng involved building altars out of soil at the peak of Mt. Tai and proclaiming the merits and legitimacy of the emperor to god of heaven. Shan involved clearing land at the foot of the mountain to show respect for the god of earth.

It was seen as a point by which emperors could meditate on the relationship between heaven and earth.

While historically considered limited to the Emperor, commoners have performed the ceremony at times without imperial permission The general Huo Qubing did it alone

It is considered a prerequisite that the empire is in a period of prosperity with a good emperor and auspicious signs to perform the ritual Many sovereigns refused to perform the ritual citing themselves as unworthy of it.

They are considered parallel to the Secular Games of the Roman Empire in their political role with both being highly infrequent celebrations. Both had high religious significance and were influential in changing narratives of power.
Religious Confucianism

History 
Worship at Mount Tai began in prehistoric times 

The Yellow Emperor is said to have performed the ceremony before ascending to heaven as an immortal.

It continued through the Zhou dynasty. During the Warring States Period, Mount Tai was located on the border between Qi and Lu, and leaders from both nations would carry out sacrifices at the mountain. In 219 BC, Qin Shihuang carried out what would come to be considered the first Feng and Shan sacrifices in celebration of uniting China.  The second emperor to carry out the sacrifices was Emperor Wu of Han. Emperor Gaozong of Tang carried out the Feng and Shan sacrifices more times than any other emperor in Chinese history. Japan, India, the Persian court in exile, Goguryeo, Baekje, Silla, the Turks, Khotan, the Khmer, and the Umayyad Caliphate all had representatives attending the Feng and Shan sacrifices held by Emperor Gaozong of Tang in 666 at Mount Tai. Wu Zetian carried out Feng and Shan sacrifices at Mount Song. The last emperor to carry out Feng and Shan sacrifices was Emperor Zhenzong of the Song dynasty. Later, emperors in the Qing dynasty would perform similar rites at Mount Tai. There are only six verifiable accounts of performances in all of Chinese history.

The last recorded traditional Feng Shan was done in 1790 by the Qianlong Emperor.

In modern times a festival claiming continuity occurs every year It is done with a large modern light show which did not exist in the medieval implementation

See also

 Dongyue Emperor
 Daijosai
 Sacrifice to Heaven
 Secular Games

References

History of religion in China
Sacrifice
Religion in China